Allocricetulus is a genus of hamsters in the family Cricetidae, which are found in Asia. It contains the following species:
 Mongolian hamster (Allocricetulus curtatus)
 Eversmann's hamster (Allocricetulus eversmanni)

References

 
Rodent genera
Taxonomy articles created by Polbot